James J. Christiana III (born October 3, 1983) is an American politician. He served as a Republican member of the Pennsylvania House of Representatives from 2009 to 2019.

The great-grandson of Italian immigrants, Christiana is a fourth-generation resident of Beaver County, Pennsylvania, and a member of the First Presbyterian Church in Beaver, Pennsylvania.  He graduated from Beaver High School in Beaver, Pennsylvania, in 2002.

He attended Washington & Jefferson College, where he played on the men's soccer team.  As a college senior in 2005, Christiana became the youngest member of the Beaver Borough Council. He graduated in 2006 with a degree in political science. He also worked as a sales consultant at the Bobby Rahal Automotive Group in Pittsburgh, Pennsylvania.  As a Republican member of the Beaver Borough Council, Christiana served as the chair of the Finance Committee.

In November 2008, he defeated Democratic incumbent Vince Biancucci to represent the 15th legislative district in the Pennsylvania House of Representatives.

In April 2017, Christiana announced he was running for Republican nomination for U.S. Senate, seeking to challenge incumbent Democratic Senator Bob Casey Jr. in 2018. Christiana ran against Berwick borough councilman Andrew Shecktor and Representative Lou Barletta. He was defeated by Barletta in the primary 63 percent to 37 percent.

Electoral history

References

External links
Jim Christiana (R) official PA House profile

1983 births
21st-century American politicians
American people of Italian descent
American Presbyterians
Candidates in the 2018 United States Senate elections
Living people
Republican Party members of the Pennsylvania House of Representatives
Pennsylvania city council members
People from Beaver County, Pennsylvania
Washington & Jefferson College alumni